Hermes Rodrigues Júnior (born 6 January 1978) is a Brazilian football coach and former player who played as a forward. He is the current head coach of Castanhal.

Career
Hermes Júnior played for clubs in Brazil and Portugal. At the end of his playing career, he signed a two-year contract with Gil Vicente F.C.

After he retired from playing football, Hermes Junior became a football coach. He led Nova Iguaçu FC to the Campeonato Carioca Serie B1 title in 2021. Hermes Junior managed America-RJ and Serrano in the Campeonato Carioca Serie A2 and B1 during 2022.

References

External links
 Profile at LPFP.pt 

1978 births
Living people
Brazilian footballers
CR Flamengo footballers
Madureira Esporte Clube players
Gil Vicente F.C. players
C.D. Santa Clara players
C.F. União players
S.C. Covilhã players
F.C. Marco players
Association football forwards
People from Nova Iguaçu
Sportspeople from Rio de Janeiro (state)
Brazilian football managers
America Football Club (RJ) managers